Fish Out of Water is a 2013 action game developed by Halfbrick Studios for iOS and Android.

Gameplay 
The player throws three swimmers from a selection of 6 fish (or rather fish and mammals) one at a time. Each fish has a unique optimal way to throw. After three fish are thrown a panel of 5 crabs judge the player with each crab having its own likes and dislikes on a scale of 1 to 10. There is a boost bar which allows the player to increase the velocity of the fish being thrown and boosting units floating on the game field, named boosties in-game, that will be collected if a swimmer comes close to them. There are also achievements to be completed.

Availability 
The game is no longer available on the App Store and Google Play as of October 2021. It is unknown when the game was removed.
It was revealed on January 25th that the game will be back to download in 2023, as of March 4th however, it is still not available for download.

Reception 

The iOS version received "average" reviews according to the review aggregation website Metacritic. Gamezebo praised the "great presentation" and the quirky personality of the fish and judges, and stated that the iOS version is "easy to pick up" while criticizing the limited replay value and the missions/objectives getting repetitive after a while. IGN called the same iOS version as not having "that same finger-licking, addictive goodness found in Halfbrick's previous hits Jetpack Joyride or Fruit Ninja."

Common Sense Media gave the iOS version all five stars, saying, "With a very basic gameplay mechanism, it's a great example of something that's easy to learn but difficult to master." However, Digital Spy gave it three stars out of five, saying that it was "still a fun pick up and play game, but after five minutes you have essentially seen everything the game has to offer. Like the game's title, Halfbrick may have stepped out of its natural element with this game, and the result is gasping desperately for air." National Post gave it a similar score of six out of ten, saying, "Halfbrick has proven in the past that less can be more, but they seem to have forgotten that without careful planning and a brilliant idea it also risks being less."

References

External links 
 

2013 video games
Action video games
Android (operating system) games
Fish in popular culture
Halfbrick Studios games
IOS games